CardCash is an American company headquartered in Brick, New Jersey that operates an online gift card marketplace where users can buy and sell discounted gift cards. The company was co-founded in 2009 by CEO Elliot Bohm and COO Marc Ackerman.

History
CardCash was created by Bohm and Ackerman after one holiday season when they were left with several unused gift cards, much like other consumers. In fact, a 2008 Consumer Reports survey found that a quarter of gift card recipients do not use the cards within a year and eventually lose them. Before creating CardCash, Bohm made a living reselling discounted electronic devices and Ackerman worked in the real estate industry in Brooklyn. Their experiences with markets, price fluctuations and price algorithm technology have been invaluable since the company was founded in 2009. From its humble origins, CardCash grew over the years to being cited in Forbes magazine, and in Inc.’s list of the fastest growing private companies in America. CardCash raised $6 million in equity funding from Guggenheim Partners in November 2013.

In July 2014, it acquired its competitor Plastic Jungle based in Silicon Valley. Through this acquisition, CardCash now owns Plastic Jungle's technology infrastructure, business partnerships and domain name, PlasticJungle.com. In October 2014, CardCash entered into a strategic partnership with Incomm Corporation. The relationship will allow CardCash to integrate its online gift card exchange with thousands of InComm's retail partner locations across the country CardCash has also signed deals with CVS, United Airlines and Walmart.

Recognition
CardCash has been cited by multiple media outlets including Forbes, Inc. ABC, and Orlando Sentinel. CardCash has been included on Forbes' list of America's Most Promising Companies for 2014 and also featured twice in Forbes and Inc.  In 2014, CardCash was included in the list of “Top Consumer Products & Services Companies” category and “Top Companies in New Jersey on the 2014 Inc. 5000”. In 2014, CEO Elliot Bohm was recognized as one “America's Most Promising CEOs Under 35.”

See also
Rebate card
Gift card

References

External links
 The Gift-Card Economy (New York Times, Stephen J. Dubner and Steven D. Levitt, January 2007)

2009 establishments in New Jersey
Companies based in New Jersey
Online retailers of the United States